C2FO is a financial technology company. C2FO operates the C2FO working capital market.

Founding & Early Years 

The company was founded in January 2008 by Sandy Kemper, former CEO of UMB Financial Corporation. C2FO was previously known as Pollenware. The name changed to C2FO based on customer feedback that the market delivered collaborative cash flow optimization or C2FO, an acronym for what the market provides.

Funding 

The first C2FO market clearing took place in 2010, and received backing of venture firm Union Square Ventures, known for investing in companies like Twitter and Zynga.
In 2015, C2FO completed a $40M round of equity funding led by Temasek Holdings, a global investment company based in Singapore. Temasek joined a list of C2FO investors including Union Square Ventures, OPENAIR Equity Partners, and Mithril Capital.
In Q1 2016, Citi Ventures became the newest investor. 
In early 2018, C2FO completed a $100M funding round led by Allianz X and Mubadala Investment Company, along with strong participation from existing C2FO investors: Temasek, Union Square Ventures, and Mithril Capital. 
In August 2019, the company announced the completion of a $200M funding round led by the SoftBank Vision Fund with additional participation from Temasek and Union Square Ventures. The investment was designed to accelerate C2FO's development of new markets to further improve access to working capital for companies globally - not just large multinational corporations, but also small and medium-sized enterprises.

Acquisition 
In October 2019, C2FO cemented its position in India by acquiring the country's largest early payment platform, Priority Vendor.

Milestones & Press 

C2FO posted its first $1 billion quarter in the fourth quarter of 2013. It experienced growth during 2014, handling $2.9 billion worth of transactions in the fourth quarter of 2014, with $1.4 billion of that happening in December.

In February 2019, The New York Times and CB Insights, a firm that tracks start-ups, included C2FO on its list of 50 private companies around the world that are on a path to a $1B valuation.

In March 2020, just ten years after funding its first customers, C2FO announced it had accelerated more than $100B in payments for companies in over 180 countries. This announcement followed a groundbreaking year during which C2FO achieved an annualized funding run rate of $39B in the fourth quarter of 2019.

In an April 2020 open letter to the Federal Reserve Bank and the U.S. Government, Kemper advocated for the creation of a Small Business Supplier Protection Plan that would provide Fortune 1000 firms in the U.S. with low-cost funding to immediately pay SMBs.

C2FO announced partnering with Experian in February 2021 to provide working capital to Experian vendors

Office locations 
C2FO is headquartered in Kansas City, Missouri.  The company has offices in 7 cities. 
 Noida
 Hong Kong
 London
 Mumbai
 Beijing
 Seattle
 Singapore

Diversity & Equality
C2FO analysis of invoices funded through C2FO early payment programs since the company's inception shows minority- and women-owned business customers of C2FO utilize those programs at a rate of nearly 1.5 times the participation level of other businesses. This would appear to indicate the traditional financial system struggles to meet the liquidity needs of disadvantaged businesses who would then appear to be required to take discounts on invoices to access working capital from C2FO. At the beginning of the economic crisis brought on by COVID-19, C2FO announced an Equity and Inclusion Program to provide diverse supplier certification, a reduced-rate early payment program for qualifying suppliers, and a community where diverse suppliers can connect, share information and explore business opportunities.

At present more than half of the C2FO's board seats are held by ethnic minorities and women.

References

Companies based in Kansas City, Missouri
Financial services companies established in 2008